Howard Bonar Jefferson (September 28, 1901 – October 1, 1983) was an American football and basketball coach, college athletics administrator, professor, and university president. He served as the head football coach at Hillsdale College in Hillsdale, Michigan from 1923 to 1924, compiling a record of 9–5–2. Jefferson was also the head basketball coach at Hillsdale from 1923 to 1925, tallying mark of 12–19.

Jefferson attended Denison University in Granville, Ohio, where he played football as an end and basketball guard and earned All-Ohio honors in both sports. He graduate from Denison in 1923 and received a Doctor of Philosophy degree from Yale University in 1929. Denison joined the faculty of the Philosophy Department at Colgate University in Hamilton, New York in 1929. From 1943 to 1945, he was the school’s assistant dean and acting director of admissions and then director of Colgate's School of Philosophy and Religion in 1945–46. From 1946 to 1967, Jefferson served as the president of Clark University in Worcester, Massachusetts. He died on October 1, 1983, at City Hospital in Worcester.

Jefferson is a member of the Norwalk, Ohio Hall of Fame.

Head coaching record

Football

References

1901 births
1983 deaths
American football ends
Guards (basketball)
Denison Big Red football players
Denison Big Red men's basketball players
Hillsdale Chargers athletic directors
Hillsdale Chargers football coaches
Hillsdale Chargers men's basketball coaches
Colgate University faculty
Presidents of Clark University
Yale University alumni
People from Norwalk, Ohio
Coaches of American football from Ohio
Players of American football from Ohio
Basketball coaches from Ohio
Basketball players from Ohio
20th-century American academics